Caroline Boissier-Butini (2 May 1786 – 9 March 1836) was a Swiss pianist and composer.

Career
Born Caroline Butini in Geneva, she was the eldest child of Pierre Butini (1759–1838) and Jeanne-Pernette, née Bardin (1764–1841). The musician wrote that her father was her most important patron, though he played no instrument. As a member of the upper class of Geneva, she grew up in a favorable environment for the artistic education of girls, but in her direct family environment nobody employed similar intensity with music as she did. In her writings the name of a teacher is mentioned only once, in 1808: François-Charles Mansui (1785–1847), a resident of Geneva between 1807 and 1812. Thus, Butini may have had lessons with him as a young adult. It is not known who taught her the basics of playing the piano.

At age 22, she was married to Auguste Boissier (1784–1856), who played the violin. He also supported her musical activities.

During travels to Paris and London in 1818, she heard some of the foremost pianists of her day including Johann Baptist Cramer, Marie Bigot de Morogues, Charles Mayer, Henri Bertini, and Frédéric Kalkbrenner. Apparently, she found her encounters with Cramer and Kalkbrenner in London particularly instructive.

As a pianist, her repertory included music by the "ancient masters" Scarlatti, Handel and Bach, then Haydn and Mozart, reaching to the "moderns" of her day including Beethoven, Field, Weber, Meyerbeer, Berlioz und Liszt.

Both as pianist and composer, she was well known in the social and artistic circles of Geneva. She once noted in her diary: "J'ai un tiers consacré de ma vie à la musique" ("I have a third of my life dedicated to music"; journal no. 3, probably 1806). She died in Prégny, near Geneva, aged 49.

Selected works
Piano and orchestra
 six piano concertos, among which
 Concerto No. 5, "Irlandais"
 Concerto No. 6, "Suisse"

Piano solo
 three piano sonatas (published Bern, 2011)
 Caprice et variations sur un air bohémien
 Variations sur l'air "Dormez mes chers amours"
 Caprice sur l'air d'une ballade écossaise
 Variations sur deux airs languedociens
 Fantaisie sur l'air de la belle Rosine
 Polonaise
 1er Potpourri
 1ère Sonatine
 Pas russe

Other
 Divertissement, for clarinet, bassoon and piano
 Pièce pour l'orgue ("Piece for Organ")

Bibliography
 Irène Minder-Jeanneret: "Die beste Musikerin der Stadt". Caroline Boissier-Butini (1786–1836) und das Genfer Musikleben zu Beginn des 19. Jahrhunderts (= Osnabrücker Beiträge zur Musik und Musikerziehung vol. 10) (Osnabrück: Epos, 2013); ISBN 978-3-940255-36-5.

Discography
 Piano Concerto No. 6 ("Swiss"); Pièce pour l'orgue; Piano Sonata No. 1; Divertissement; performed by Eva-Maria Zimmermann (piano); Regula Küffer (flute); Nicoleta Paraschivescu (organ); Babette Dorn (piano); Didier Puntos (piano); Michel Westphal (clarinet); Catherine Pépin (bassoon); Berner Kammerorchester, Matthias Kuhn (cond.); on: VDE-Gallo CD-1277.
 Variations sur l'air "Dormez mes chers amours"; performed by Adalberto Maria Riva (piano); on: VDE-Gallo CD-1406.
 Piano Sonata No. 1; Caprice sur l'air d'une ballade écossaise; Sonatine No. 1; Variations sur deux airs languedociens; Piano Sonata No. 2; Caprice et variations sur un air bohémien; performed by Edoardo Torbianelli (piano); on: VDE-Gallo CD-1418.
 Piano Concertos No. 5 ("Irish") and No. 6 ("Swiss"); Divertissement; performed by Adalberto Maria Riva (piano), Sarah van Corneval (flute), Pierre-André Taillard (clarinet), Rogério Gonçalves (bassoon); on: VDE-Gallo CD-1627 (CD, 2020).

References

1786 births
1836 deaths
19th-century classical composers
19th-century Swiss women
19th-century women composers
Classical-period composers
Composers for piano
Women classical composers
Musicians from Geneva
Swiss classical composers
Swiss classical pianists
Swiss women pianists
Women classical pianists
19th-century women pianists